George Alencherry is the Major Archbishop of the Syro-Malabar Catholic Church and also a cardinal of the Catholic Church. He was elected by the Holy Synod of the Syro-Malabar Church in 2011 to succeed Varkey Vithayathil (1999–2011). He was created a cardinal on 18 February 2012 by Pope Benedict XVI. He was the first bishop of Thuckalay from 1997 to 2011 before his enthronement as the major archbishop.

Early life 
Alencherry was born on 19 April 1945 as the sixth child of Mary and Philipose Alencherry in Thuruthy in the Syro-Malabar Catholic Archeparchy of Changanassery. Geevarghese is his baptismal name. Alencherry had his primary schooling at St Mary's School (Thuruthy) and secondary education at St Berchman's High School (Changanacherry). He began his priestly formation in 1961 at the archdiocesan minor seminary at Parel, Changanacherry. While he pursued his studies in the minor seminary, he obtained his BA in economics with the second rank from St. Berchmans College Changanacherry. After minor seminary studies he was sent to St Joseph's Pontifical Seminary (Aluva), where he completed his philosophical and theological studies.

On 18 December 1972, Antony Padiyara, the then archbishop of Chanagancherry, ordained him a priest at St. Mary's Church (Thuruthy) for the archdiocese of Changanacherry. Later he continued his higher studies at the Pontifical Institute of Theology and Philosophy from where he obtained his master's degree in the first rank. While Alencherry was pursuing higher studies at Aluva he served also as vicar of the filial church at Periyarmugham in the Syro-Malabar Catholic Major Archeparchy of Ernakulam-Angamaly. After completion of studies at Aluva, Alencherry was appointed as assistant vicar at the cathedral church of Changanacherry and Director of the Archdiocesan Faith Formation department. Thereafter he served three years as secretary of the Commission for Catechism of the Kerala Catholic Bishops' Council (KCBC). After his tenure at KCBC he was sent to Paris for higher studies. There he pursued his studies at Sorbonne University France and the Catholic Institute from where he obtained his doctorate in biblical theology. On returning to India in 1986, Alencherry was appointed director of the pastoral Oriental Centre (POC) at Palarivattom and deputy secretary of KCBC. He served the church in Kerala in that capacity until 1993. Simultaneously he had served also as a professor at St Thomas Apostolic Seminary (Vadavathoor). He continued to teach at Vadavathoor until 1997. From 1994 to 1996 he was the protosyncellus of the metropolitan of Changanacherry.

Ecclesial service

Bishop of Thuckalay
Pope John Paul II erected the Diocese of Thuckalay by the papal bull Apud Indorum on 11 November 1996. It was formed by separating the territory of the Archdiocese of Changanassery that extended over to the state of Tamil Nadu. Alencherry, who was Vicar General of the Archdiocese of Changanacherry, was appointed the first bishop of the new eparchy. The establishment of the diocese and Alencherry's appointment were promulgated on 18 December 1996. Alencherry was consecrated bishop on 2 February 1997 by Joseph Powathil, Metropolitan Archbishop of Changanassery, with Mathew Vattackuzhy, Bishop of Kanjirappally, and Lawrence Aprem, Bishop of Marthandam, as co-consecrants. He was installed as bishop on the same day by Varkey Vithayathil, Major Archbishop of the Syro-Malabar Church.

Major Archbishop
The Syro-Malabar Catholic Church Bishops' holy synod that began on 23 May 2011 at the Major Archiepiscopal Curia at Mount St Thomas (Eranakulam) elected Alencherry to be Major Archbishop of Ernakulam-Angamaly and head of the Syro-Malabar Church. The news of the election was announced in the Vatican as well as at Mount St Thomas, the Syro-Malabar Major Archiepiscopal Curia, on 26 May 2011. Alencherry was elected as the successor of the deceased Major Archbishop Varkey Vithayathil. He is the first head of the Syro-Malabar Church to be elected by its synod. Previously, when Pope John Paul II had raised the Syro-Malabar Church to be a Major Archiepiscopal Church in 1992, appointing Antony Padiyara as its first Major Archbishop, he had reserved to himself the authority to appoint the bishops, including the Major Archbishop. However, in 2004, the Holy See granted full administrative powers to the church, including the authority to elect bishops.

On 23 May, the first day of the synod, the fathers elected George Valiamattam, the metropolitan archbishop of Tellicherry, to preside over it. Then followed the procedures of election of the new Major Archbishop. Thereafter the president of the session asked Alencherry whether he accepted the election and in the following sitting, the newly elect expressed his acceptance by reading a statement out before the synod. Immediately the request was sent to the Pope, through the Apostolic Nunciature in New Delhi, for Letters of Communion approving the election. These were granted on the evening of Wednesday, 25 May, and were  communicated to the Administrator of the Major Archiepiscopal see, Bosco Puthur, on the morning of Thursday, 26 May. The papal approval of the election of Alencherry was announced in the synod by Mar George Valiamattam. Thereafter the newly Major Archbishop elect, in accordance with canon law, took the oath of fidelity and communion to the Holy Synod and the Church. Thereafter all the bishops of the Syro-Malabar Church expressed their respect and ecclesial communion to the new Major Archbishop. Alencherry declared his service would be for all the people of India. He stressed Christian ecumenical relations and harmony with other religions.

On 18 February 2012, Pope Benedict XVI elevated Alencherry to the rank of cardinal during a ceremony in Saint Peter's Basilica, creating him Cardinal-Priest of San Bernardo alle Terme. Earlier cardinals belonging to the Syro-Malabar Catholic Church were Joseph Parecattil (28 April 1969), Antony Padiyara (28 June 1988) and Varkey Vithayathil (21 February 2001).

Alencherry's visit to Rome for that consistory coincided with the arrest of Italian merchant marine officers on board the Enrica Lexie who shot and killed two Kerala fishermen on a fishing vessel. Alencherry provided a statement to the Italian news service Agenzia Fides that "This episode must be investigated: if there is a guilty action, it must be treated legally and the guilty must be punished. We must fully respect truth and justice." He denied any interest in serving as a mediator. He had previously been quoted accusing some Kerala politicians of exploiting the incident for their own purposes and seemed to suggest he was actively seeking to resolve the dispute. Upon his return to India, he expressed unreserved sympathy for the families of the dead fishermen and ascribed any other misunderstandings to misquotes by Fides.

On 24 April 2012, Alencherry was made a member of the Congregation for the Doctrine of the Faith and of the Congregation for the Oriental Catholic Churches.

Alencherry participated as a cardinal-elector in the 2013 conclave that elected Pope Francis. During the conclave, Alencherry (along with Coptic Catholic Patriarch-Emeritus Antonios Naguib, Maronite Patriarch Bechara Boutros al-Rahi, and Syro-Malankara Major Archbishop Baselios Cleemis) was one of the four cardinal-electors from outside the Latin Church who wore different vestments, proper to their respective churches.

Alencherry was one of the dignitaries in a function attended by Prime Minister Narendra Modi organized by the Church after a series of attacks on Christian properties by right-wing groups. Alencherry commented that Modi's speech was sincere, but he may find it difficult in putting his words to action in the future.

He underwent angioplasty on 8 December 2017.

In December 2019 Alencherry was elected head of the Kerala Catholic Bishops Council, a state-wide organization of Catholic bishops. This move subsequently met with  criticism from a section of believers in the Church owing to accusations of corruption against him in a land deal case from 2016. As president of the Kerala Catholic Bishop's Conference, he made all Catholic hospitals open and available for the treatment of COVID-19 patients.

In December 2019 Alencherry called upon the Union government to reconsider the Citizenship (Amendment) Act, 2019, saying the act lacked clarity in many areas. He said "The problems should not become communal. There should be no conflict between religions or between states." and said that he hoped the government would  introduce a mitigated version of the same act. Alencherry received a pamphlet distributed by the Bharatiya Janata Party (BJP) supporting the CAA in January 2020.

In January 2021 Cardinal Alencherry along with Cardinals Baselios Cleemis and Oswald Gracias, were received by Prime Minister Narendra Modi and conveyed the grievances of the Christian community.

Views

Pastoral care of the Syro-Malabar Catholics outside the "proper" territory

Historically the Prelates of St. Thomas Christians were called Archbishops of India. The titles used for them were "Metropolitan and Gate of All India" or "Gate of India". This indicates the highest rank of authority in the Indian Church and the extent of its jurisdiction. He enjoyed an All India jurisdiction, the ruler of the entire Holy Church of Christians of India. The Vatican Codex 22, written in Cranganore in 1301, gives the titles as Metropolitan and director of the entire holy church of Christian India. In 1564, Pope Pius IV created the Archdiocese of Angamaly (with jurisdiction over all India).

For the Catholics, in 1600 the metropolitan status of the see of Angamaly was abolished and was made suffragan to Goa, with far-reaching consequences. Later, the metropolitan status was restored to the see of Angamaly but never the title of "All India". In 1896, Syro-Malabar Catholics got their own hierarchy, but instead of re-establishing the old jurisdiction over all India, three Apostolic vicariates were established in Trichur, Ernakulam and Kottayam.

By the second half of twentieth century, members of the Syro-Malabar community have emigrated in big numbers to other parts of India and to foreign countries. According to Vatican II and subsequent documents, their pastoral needs must be met by the priests of their own rite and in their own rite. For the pastoral care of these Syro-Malabar Catholics, there exist a Diocese of Kalyan, a Diocese of Chicago, and others. Big cities of India like Delhi, Bangalore, Madras, Calcutta have many Syro-Malabar Catholics.

Pope Francis resolved this issue to some extent in October 2017 with the creation of the Eparchy of Shamshabad to encompass all the areas of India not included within the jurisdiction of an existing eparchy.

Christian unity and Petrine ministry

Controversies

Liturgy unification and Latinisation dispute

Historical overview
The Syro-Malabar liturgy was in a heavily Latinised state following the Synod of Diamper in 1599. Archdiocese of Angamaly, the ancient metropolitan see of the Syro-Malabar Church, was degraded as a suffragan diocese of the Padroado Latin Catholic Archdiocese of Goa and its all India jurisdiction was abolished. Although Syriac was retained as the sacred language, the liturgical books were modified to closely resemble the Roman Rite. For over three centuries, the Malabar Catholics were administered by Latin hierarchy. The cultural hegemony was generally supported by the papacy and the propaganda congregation.

From 1934 onwards, popes encouraged a process of de-Latinisation which resulted in divergence of opinion among Syro-Malabar Catholics. Following the Second Vatican Council, the Archdiocese of Ernakulam–under the leadership of Joseph Parecattil–and its ecclesiastical province changed to a Latinised versus populum posture during Holy Qurbana. This same Latinized party advocated for a unified, Indianised (including the adoption of some Hindu customs) liturgy for all three sui juris churches–the Latin, Syro-Malabar and Syro-Malankara– in India. This move was opposed by the Congregation for the Oriental Churches and the Archdiocese of Changanacherry. This created liturgical and ideological disunity within the Syro-Malabar Church.

In 1992, the Syro-Malabar Catholic Church was elevated to the status of a major archiepiscopal church with Ernakulam as the primatal see. In 1999, the Synod of the Syro-Malabar Church led by its then-Major Archbishop Varkey Vithayathil, drew up a formula of reunion by incorporating the ideals of both factions. The new pattern of liturgical celebration came to be known as the Synodal Form with pre-Anaphoral and post-Anaphoral parts of the liturgy celebrated versus populum like that in the Latin Church and the Anaphora celebrated ad orientem. However the formula was unimplemented by some dioceses, starting from that of Jacob Thoomkuzhy. Major Archbishop Varkey Vithayathil himself was forced to sign dispensation in his archdiocese, Ernakulam-Angamaly.

Attempts made by George Alencherry
Major Archbishop George Alencherry, from the date of his installation, emphasised the need for unity in liturgical celebration and expressed that it was his most important task. However, his attempts were met with protests from the diocesan priests of Ernakulam-Angamaly. Meanwhile, George Alencherry was successful in persuading the Synod of the Syro-Malabar Church to legislate on liturgical unification and in bringing more dioceses into the implementation of the decision made in 1999. The Synod in 2020 approved the revised form of the liturgy and it was confirmed in 2021, both by the pope and the Synod. Meanwhile, protests erupted in the Archdiocese of Ernakulam-Angamaly lead by a number of priests. This was accompanied by the land scam allegation which lead to the installation of Antony Kariyil as the metropolitan vicar of the major archbishop. The metropolitan vicar, being responsible for the ordinary administration of the archdiocese, met the pope in November 2021 and issued an order of dispensation from the decision made by the synod. Initially, some other dioceses also followed the same path but later revoked the dispensation. But Antony Kariyil has maintained its stand and the major section of priests of Ernakulam-Angamaly vehemently bargaining for a Latinised rite.

Land deal Controversy and Ernakulam priests' revolt

In March the city police initiated an investigation into the real estate transactions after a private citizen, a lay Catholic, lodged a complaint against Alencherry, two priests, and a real estate agent. The Kerala High Court observed that there was prima facie evidence to indicate criminal conspiracy, breach of trust and misappropriation of money. A single bench judge of Kerala High Court found the complainant had standing to bring the lawsuit because the property at issue was not private property, but assets held in trust with Alencherry as caretaker. On 16 March 2018, the division bench of Kerala High Court stayed a court order requiring the police investigation because the complainant had sought the order without first allowing the police to follow their procedures and removed some verbal comments of the single judge abusing ecclesiastical powers of the head of the church. Later that month, a group of 90 priests out of 400 staged a street demonstration calling on Alencherry to stand aside, pending resolution of the legal procedure, while more than 200 lay Catholics responded with a demonstration in support of Alencherry. The Vatican's proper role and its failure to intervene was decried and defended as well.

On 22 June 2018, Pope Francis named Jacob Manathodath, Bishop of Palghat the Apostolic Administrator seda plena of the Archieparchy of Ernakulam-Angamaly under the recommendation of Alencherry.

In April 2019, the Kakkanad Judicial First Class Magistrate Court filed a criminal complaint against Alencherry for breaches of the law and massive disparities in the church's land agreements. The Ernakulam Principal Sessions Court ruled on 24 August 2019 that Alencherry, along with the former financial officer of the archdiocese and a real estate agent will face charges. The Joseph Injodey commission, which was created by apostolic administrator bishop Jacob Manathodath to investigate the property dealings, submitted its findings in March 2019 to Bishop Manathodath, who would forward it to Cardinal Sandri, prefect of the Congregation for Oriental Churches in Rome. The Income Tax Department fined the Syro-Malabar Church's archbishop of Ernakulam-Angamaly Rs 3 crore for the contentious land purchases that occurred between April 2013 and March 2018. During the investigation, the department discovered that there were attempts to avoid tax in the land sale, and the plots were registered for lower amounts while the sale was done for greater amounts. Bishop Antony Kariyil of Mandya was then appointed as the episcopal vicar of the major archbishop and given the personal title "archbishop". Alencherry returned to the helm of the Ernakulam-Angamaly Archdiocese on 27 June 2019, after the Vatican terminated the appointment of apostolic administrator.

The land deal row was investigated by KPMG, a private audit firm appointed by the Vatican. The 2019 KPMG report revealed that an inquiry has found a lack of transparency in the appointment of agents in the land deals. Laity activists sought civil and legal action on the matter and action against George Alencherry who was the diocese head. The police team investigating the case submitted a report to the Chief Judicial Magistrate Court in Ernakulam in December 2020, stating that there is no evidence of conspiracy or excessive gain by George Alencherry in the incident.

The High Court of Kerala denied Alencherry's plea in August 2021, which sought to dismiss the cases filed against him for alleged criminal breach of trust, criminal conspiracy, and fraudulent execution of settlement documents in the lawsuit challenging the lower court's verdict. The Kerala High Court ruled in August 2021 that George Alencherry must stand trial in the case. The court found that a significant information had been suppressed, and directed the government to investigate whether any state land had been included in the sale. It had also criticized the police for not registering a case despite being in possession of enough information. In September 2021, the Kerala government has formed a seven-member enquiry team to probe the cases related to the land deals.

Forged documents by priests
A 24-year-old man was arrested on 19 May 2019 for allegedly forging documents against  Alencherry, following which a row has erupted in Syro-Malabar church with a section of priests protesting against the arrest. Three bishops of the Ernakulam-Angamaly Archdiocese have come out openly against the arrest of the man claiming that he is not a criminal and he had no role in forging documents. The priests have claimed that the man, a faithful, while working as an intern with a reputed business group in Kochi, had taken a screenshot of documents allegedly having Alencherry's name from the computer server of the firm and brought it to the notice of a church priest Tony Kalookaran. The priest reportedly shared it with another priest, who allegedly submitted it to a Synod of the Syro-Malabar Catholic Church. The priests, including auxiliary bishops of the Ernakulam-Angamaly Archdiocese, have demanded a high-level probe into the forgery case. Police have said the documents, purportedly linking the Syro-Malabar Church head with the accounts of a private bank, were found to be forged during their investigation. According to them, the cardinal was found not operating any account in the bank named in the documents. The priests, including Bishop Jacob Manathodath, who was appointed as the administrator of the Ernakulam-Angamaly Archdiocese by Pope Francis on 22 June 2018, have urged the government to order either a CBI or a judicial probe into the case. Meanwhile, the police made Kallookaran also an accused in the case on 21 May 2019. Former Auxiliary Bishops Sebastian Adayanthrath and Jose Puthenveettil had also joined Bishop Manathodath at a press conference held on 20 May 2019 to raise the demand. Refuting the allegations of torture in custody, the police said they were carrying out a "scientific probe" into the case.

Love jihad controversy 
In January 2020, a circular issued by Alencherry about love jihad was read out at Catholic churches on Sunday liturgies, the circular alleged that Christian women are targeted, recruited to Islamic state and even killed. However, the circular was not read in many of the churches in Ernakulam district due to differing opinions. The church's statement sparked criticism from its leaders and followers. Reformists criticized the church for labeling interfaith weddings as "love jihad." Many clergy directly challenged the legitimacy of the statements. Reformist groups such as the Archdiocesan Movement for Transparency, the Council Against Religious Exploitation and the Joint Christian Council criticized the church, claiming that such remarks were meant to divert attention away from the corruption charges of the church's leaders.

Notes

References

External links

 
 
 
Vatican letter; marunadanmalayali.com
 

1945 births
Living people
Syro-Malabar Catholic Archbishops of Ernakulam-Angamaly
Institut Catholique de Paris alumni
Cardinals created by Pope Benedict XVI
Indian cardinals
Members of the Congregation for the Doctrine of the Faith
Members of the Congregation for the Oriental Churches
People from Changanassery
Christian clergy from Kottayam